Omobranchus robertsi is a species of combtooth blenny found in the western central Pacific ocean, around Papua New Guinea. The specific name honours Tyson R. Roberts, the American ichthyologist.

References

robertsi
Fish described in 1981
Taxa named by Victor G. Springer